The Horizon is a type of single-level intercity railroad passenger car used by Amtrak, the national rail passenger carrier in the United States. Amtrak ordered the cars to supplement their existing fleet of Amfleet I single-level cars used on shorter distance corridor trains. The design was based on the Comet railcar used for commuter railroads, but with modifications to make them more suitable for intercity service. Bombardier Transportation built 104 cars from 1988 to 1990 in two basic types: coaches and food service (café) cars.

The first Horizon cars entered revenue service in April 1989. The majority of the fleet was assigned to the short-haul (300 miles or less) intercity routes out of Chicago that operate under the Amtrak Midwest branding.

History

In 1988, Amtrak and Bombardier signed a contract for 104 Horizon cars, based on the Comet railcar, built for use on commuter railroads. The Horizon cars allowed Amtrak to add capacity to its fleet quickly since it was adapted from a proven design, and Bombardier Transportation was already in full production of Comet II railcars. Amtrak was also able to finance the Horizon cars privately, making them the first railcars the railroad was able to purchase without securing federal funding.

Bombardier delivered the cars between 1989 and spring 1990, from its Barre, Vermont assembly plant in two basic types: 86 coaches and 18 food service cars. The first Horizon cars entered revenue service in April 1989. 

In 1994, Amtrak considered ordering a further 23 Horizon cars to replace the troublesome gas-turbine Turboliner trainsets used on New York's Empire Corridor service, but the order was never placed.

Design 
The design of the Horizon cars was adapted from the Comet I, a single-level commuter coach designed and built by Pullman-Standard in 1970–1973 for the Erie Lackawanna Railroad and New Jersey Department of Transportation (NJDOT). Bombardier acquired the rights to the design of the Comet car from Pullman and in 1982 built the second generation Comet II cars for New Jersey Transit.

Bombardier made several modifications to make them more suitable for intercity service.

Coaches 
The 72 standard coaches could seat between 76 and 82 passengers depending on the seating configuration and 14 accessible coaches could seat 72 and included space for a wheelchair. The entire coach fleet was later rebuilt to be accessible, with cars now seating between 68 and 72 passengers depending on the seating configuration.

Food service cars 
The 18 food service cars were configured in either a café/club (table seating on one end of the car and business class seating on the other) or dinette (all table seating) configuration. Both configurations have a food service counter in the middle of the car. The 8 cars in the café/club configuration could seat up to 32 people around dining tables and 19 people in business class seating. The 10 cars in the dinette configuration could seat up to 48 people around dining tables.

Routes served
, the Horizon coach cars primarily are used on trains based out of Amtrak's Chicago division including the Illinois Service (Carl Sandburg,  Illini, Illinois Zephyr, Lincoln Service & Saluki), Michigan Services (Blue Water & Wolverine), Hiawatha and Missouri River Runner.

Additionally, several Horizon cars are assigned to Amtrak's Los Angeles division for use on the Pacific Surfliner route.

Horizon cars have been temporarily assigned to the Amtrak Cascades while the Washington State Department of Transportation and Amtrak prepare to purchase new equipment for the route. These cars are assigned to Amtrak's Seattle division.

See also
 Shoreliner - Similar cars operated by Metro-North Railroad.

References

External links
 
 Amtrak Photo Archives- Horizon Fleet Cars

Amtrak rolling stock
Rail passenger cars of the United States
Bombardier Transportation rail vehicles
Train-related introductions in 1989